Shona often refers to:

 Shona people, a Southern African people
 Shona language, a Bantu language spoken by Shona people today

Shona may also refer to:

 Shona (album), 1994 album by New Zealand singer Shona Laing
 Shona (given name)
 Shona cabbage, a common name for the vegetable Cleome gynandra
 Shona languages, a wider group of languages as defined in the early 20th Century
 Shona music, the traditional music of the Shona people
 Shona hopper, a butterfly 
 Shona hotspot, a geographical feature in the Atlantic ocean
 Kingdom of Zimbabwe, a Shona state in the 13th to 15th Centuries
 Eilean Shona, a Scottish island

Language and nationality disambiguation pages